Guató can refer to:

Guató people, an indigenous group living in Brazil and Bolivia
Guató language, a language isolate used by the Guató